The First Colony Inn, also known as LeRoy's Seaside Inn, First Colony Motor Inn, First Colony Apartments, and Colony Beach Inn, is a historic hotel building located at Nags Head, Dare County, North Carolina.  It was designed by Willis Leigh and built by Frank Benton  It first opened in 1932 as LeRoy's Seaside Inn, by Henry LeRoy of Elizabeth City, North Carolina. The inn is a 2 1/2-story, balloon frame building in the vernacular Shingle Style.  The building is divided into three equal sections (approximately 25 feet by 60 feet each) separated by open breezeways and arranged in an "H"-shaped configuration.  Surrounding the building is a two-story engaged verandah.

It was listed on the National Register of Historic Places in 1993.

References

Hotel buildings on the National Register of Historic Places in North Carolina
Shingle Style architecture in North Carolina
Hotel buildings completed in 1932
Buildings and structures in Dare County, North Carolina
Hotels in North Carolina
National Register of Historic Places in Dare County, North Carolina